Sava Grozdev (born July 13, 1950, in Sofia, Bulgaria) is a Bulgarian mathematician and educator. He currently holds positions as Professor in Mathematics (Mathematical Analysis) and Professor in Mathematical Education.

Biography
Grozdev has PhD degree in mathematics (1980) and DSc degree in Pedagogical Sciences (2003).

His teaching and research activities are in the field of Mathematics and Pedagogical Sciences. He has given courses in Mathematical Analysis, Analytical Mechanics, Generalized Functions, Operational Calculus, Content of Geometry, History of Mathematics, Methodology, Control and Stability of Mechanical Systems, Nonlinear Oscillations, and Chosen Chapters of Mathematics. He has authored more than 150 scientific publications, several books and handbooks, and more than 200 Olympic problems.

Grozdev is most notable for his pedagogical work in mathematics education, both for students and for teachers. He has developed a mathematical model for high achievements in Mathematics.

In 2003 Sava Grozdev was the leader of a group of teachers which took a prize in the International Competition of the American Organization “Best Practices in Education”. In the period 1994–2003 he was the scientific leader of the Bulgarian National Team in Mathematics. Under his leadership during Balkan and International Mathematical Olympiads the Bulgarian students won 59 medals out of 60 possible: 33 gold, 24 silver and 2 bronze. The highest achievement was in 2003 when Bulgaria became World Champion at the International Mathematical Olympiad in Tokyo.

Sava Grozdev has been awarded with prestigious foreign and international prizes. In 2003 he received the Sign of Honour of the President of the Republic of Bulgaria. He has been awarded with the Sign of Honour of the Bulgarian Academy of Sciences (2003), the Sign of Honour of Sofia Community (2003), the Jubilee Medal of the Latvian Mathematical Society (2004), the Honourable Professorship of the South-West University (2006), the medal “St. Cyril and Methodius” – 1st Degree (2007).

References

EUROPEAN MATHEMATICAL SOCIETY ARTICLE COMPETITION - THIRD PRIZE
Professors Sava Grozdev, Ivan Derzhanski and Evgenia Sendova, Union of
Bulgarian Mathematicians, Sofia, Bulgaria.
For the article For those who think mathematics dreary, published in the
Bulgarian daily newspaper Dnevnik, 27 December 2001.
The prize winning article by Grozdev, Derzhanski and Sendova can be found
in Bulgarian and English at:

Bulgarian mathematicians
Bulgarian educators
Living people
1950 births
Scientists from Sofia